Stanley Edward Jok (May 3, 1926 – March 6, 1972) was an American professional baseball player. A third baseman, Jok played all or parts of 14 seasons in minor league baseball, where he hit 192 home runs, but his Major League opportunity was limited to 12 total games played with the  Philadelphia Phillies and the – Chicago White Sox.

Jok had spent seven full seasons in the minors for three organizations before the Phillies gave him a chance at the outset of the 1954 season. He was used as a pinch hitter in three games, and went hitless. Placed on waivers, he was claimed by the White Sox, who assigned him to their Double-A affiliate, the Memphis Chickasaws, where Jok batted over .300. Recalled in September 1954, he started at three games for the ChiSox. In the first of those games, he registered his first MLB hit, an RBI single off Art Houtteman, and later drew a bases-loaded walk for another RBI. But he collected only one more hit in eight at bats in his next two starts.

Jok made the 1955 White Sox roster coming out of spring training and appeared in six more games, largely as a pinch hitter and pinch runner. But in his only start at third base, on May 1 at Comiskey Park against the Baltimore Orioles, Jok connected for his only Major League home run, a solo shot off Jim McDonald. He returned to minor league baseball for good at the mid-May cutdown. As a Major Leaguer, Jok had 22 plate appearances and 19 at-bats; of his three hits, only his homer went for extra bases.

Jok was a fixture in the Triple-A International League, where he appeared in 1,149 games for seven teams representing five different cities between 1950 and 1961, Jok's final pro season.

References

External links

Venezuelan Professional Baseball League statistics

1926 births
1972 deaths
Baltimore Orioles (IL) players
Baseball players from Buffalo, New York
Chicago White Sox players
Jersey City Giants players
Jersey City Jerseys players
Leones del Caracas players
American expatriate baseball players in Venezuela
Major League Baseball third basemen
Memphis Chickasaws players
Minneapolis Millers (baseball) players
Mobile Bears players
Omaha Cardinals players
Oshkosh Giants players
Ottawa A's players
Ottawa Giants players
Philadelphia Phillies players
Rochester Red Wings players
Sioux City Soos players
Toronto Maple Leafs (International League) players
Trenton Giants players
Burials in Buffalo, New York